Timothy Gerard "Tim" Szymanski (born 1962) is a retired United States Navy vice admiral who last served as deputy commander of United States Special Operations Command from October 15, 2018 to December 2021. He is the former commander of United States Naval Special Warfare Command in Coronado, California.

Early life and education
Szymanski is a native of Wilmington, Delaware. He graduated from the Salesianum School in 1980, where he was a three-year varsity letterman in wrestling and, in 1980, represented the United States in an international AAU Freestyle wrestling tournament in Tokyo, Japan. He then attended the Naval Academy Preparatory School from 1980 to 1981, and graduated from the United States Naval Academy in 1985. He completed a Masters of Joint Campaign Planning and Strategy at Joint Advanced Warfighting School.

Naval career
After receiving his commission in 1985, Szymanski served in the Surface Warfare community and qualified as a surface warfare officer before transitioning to the SEALs. He volunteered for Basic Underwater Demolition/SEAL training (BUD/S) graduating with Class 161 in 1989. Following SEAL Tactical Training (STT) and completion of six month probationary period, he received the 1130 designator as a Naval Special Warfare Officer, entitled to wear the Special Warfare insignia also known as "SEAL Trident".

Szymanski's Naval Special Warfare (NSW) and operational assignments include platoon commander and task unit commander at SEAL Delivery Vehicle Team 2. In 1992, Szymanski volunteered for assignment to Naval Special Warfare Development Group (NSWDG) in Damneck, Virginia, and completed a specialized selection and training course known as Green Team. He served as troop commander, squadron commander and current operations officer with the command until 1997. Szymanski was selected as commanding officer of Special Boat Unit 26 and later returned to NSWDG for a 2nd tour as unit operations officer from 2000 to 2002. As a commander, Szymanski served as commanding officer of SEAL Team TWO from 2002 to 2004.
Szymanski's staff assignments include officer community manager for NSW and enlisted community manager for SEALs, Navy Divers, explosive ordnance disposal (EOD) technicians, and special warfare combatant craft crewmen (SWCC). He served on the Joint Staff as the J3 deputy directorate for Special Operations as the Global War on Terror branch chief and as chief staff officer of Pakistan-Afghanistan Coordination Cell.

Szymanski commanded a O6-level Joint Task Force in Afghanistan, served as deputy unit commander of Naval Special Warfare Development Group from 2007 to 2008 and commanded Naval Special Warfare Group TWO from 2009 to 2011. He served as deputy commanding general sustainment to Special Operations Joint Task Force-Afghanistan/NATO Special Operations Component Command-Afghanistan.

On 3 August 2016, Szymanski succeeded Rear Admiral Brian L. Losey as commander, Naval Special Warfare Command. His prior assignment was the assistant to the commander of Joint Special Operations Command at Fort Bragg, North Carolina.

On 19 July 2018, Szymanski was nominated for promotion to vice admiral, but his next assignment was not disclosed at the time.

He retired from active duty in December 2021.

Awards and decorations
Szymanski has received multiple awards and recognitions:

In 2015, Szymanski was inducted into Salesianum School's hall of fame.

References
 

1962 births
Living people
Place of birth missing (living people)
People from Wilmington, Delaware
Salesianum School alumni
United States Naval Academy alumni
United States Navy SEALs personnel
Joint Forces Staff College alumni
Recipients of the Legion of Merit
United States Navy admirals
Recipients of the Defense Superior Service Medal
Recipients of the Navy Distinguished Service Medal